is a Japanese badminton player.

Achievements

Youth Olympic Games 
Mixed doubles

Asia Junior Championships 
Boys' singles

Boys' doubles

BWF World Tour (3 titles) 
The BWF World Tour, which was announced on 19 March 2017 and implemented in 2018, is a series of elite badminton tournaments sanctioned by the Badminton World Federation (BWF). The BWF World Tour is divided into levels of World Tour Finals, Super 1000, Super 750, Super 500, Super 300 (part of the HSBC World Tour), and the BWF Tour Super 100.

Men's singles

BWF Grand Prix (1 title, 1 runner-up) 
The BWF Grand Prix had two levels, the Grand Prix and Grand Prix Gold. It was a series of badminton tournaments sanctioned by the Badminton World Federation (BWF) and played between 2007 and 2017.

Men's singles

  BWF Grand Prix Gold tournament
  BWF Grand Prix tournament

BWF International Challenge/Series (2 titles, 2 runners-up) 
Men's singles

  BWF International Challenge tournament
  BWF International Series tournament

References

External links 
 

1996 births
Living people
Sportspeople from Shiga Prefecture
Japanese male badminton players
Badminton players at the 2014 Summer Youth Olympics
Badminton players at the 2020 Summer Olympics
Olympic badminton players of Japan
Badminton players at the 2018 Asian Games
Asian Games bronze medalists for Japan
Asian Games medalists in badminton
Medalists at the 2018 Asian Games
21st-century Japanese people